Trap Happy Porky is a 1945 Warner Bros. Looney Tunes short directed by Chuck Jones and written by Tedd Pierce. The short was released on February 24, 1945, and features Porky Pig, along with Hubie and Bertie, an early version of Claude Cat and a prototype of Hector the Bulldog.

Plot
At Uncle Tom's Cabins, Porky is trying to get some sleep, but mice Hubie and Bertie are down there stealing food and breaking things against his will. He tries to capture them with a simple mousetrap, but fails as the mice prove to be too smart for him. He then gets a cat and it throws the mice out with his contraption. 

Porky keeps the cat and goes to sleep, but the cat invites other cats to get intoxicated, play the piano and drunkenly sing. After failing multiple times to throw them out, Porky buys a bulldog from town to get rid of them, but the dog also gets drunk and sings with the cats instead. With no other options remaining, Porky joins and sings with the dog and the cats.

Home media
Trap Happy Porky is available unedited and restored with its original opening and closing titles on Looney Tunes Mouse Chronicles: The Chuck Jones Collection.

References

External links
 
 Trap Happy Porky at Dailymotion

1945 films
1945 animated films
1945 short films
Looney Tunes shorts
Warner Bros. Cartoons animated short films
Short films directed by Chuck Jones
Films about cats
Films about dogs
Animated films about mice
Porky Pig films
1940s Warner Bros. animated short films
Claude Cat films
Hubie and Bertie films